The Adventures of Don Coyote is a 1947 American Western comedy film in Cinecolor. It is directed by Reginald Le Borg and written by Robert Creighton Williams and Harold Tarshis. The film stars Richard Martin, Frances Rafferty, Val Carlo, Benny Bartlett, Marc Cramer and Frank Fenton. The film was released on May 9, 1947, by United Artists.

Voice Cast 
Richard Martin as Don Coyote
Frances Rafferty as Maggie Riley
Val Carlo as Sancho
Benny Bartlett as Ted Riley
Marc Cramer as Sheriff Dave Sherman
Frank Fenton as Big Foot Ferguson
Byron Foulger as Henry Felton
Eddie Parker as Henchman Joe 
Pierce Lyden as Henchman Jeff
Frank McCarroll as Henchman Steve

References

External links 
 

1947 films
1947 comedy films
1940s Western (genre) comedy films
American Western (genre) comedy films
Cinecolor films
1940s English-language films
Films directed by Reginald Le Borg
United Artists films
1940s American films